Hans Hansen (5 February 1891 – 20 January 1976) was a Danish footballer. He played in two matches for the Denmark national football team in 1920.

References

External links
 

1891 births
1976 deaths
Danish men's footballers
Denmark international footballers
Place of birth missing
Association footballers not categorized by position